This is a timeline of the history of the broadcasting of breakfast radio programmes on national stations in the United Kingdom.

1950s 
 1950 to 1956
 No events.
 1957
 28 October – The Today programme launches on the BBC Home Service as a programme of "topical talks" to give listeners an alternative to listening to light music which the Home Service had previously broadcast at breakfast.
 1958
 No events.
 1959
 No events.

1960s 

 1960 to 1964
 No events.
 1965
 25 October –  Breakfast Special is broadcast for the first time on the BBC Light Programme. The programme replaces Morning Music.
 1966
 No events.
 1967
 30 September – Tony Blackburn launches BBC Radio 1 when he starts presenting the first edition of the Radio 1 Breakfast. 90 minutes earlier, BBC Radio 2 had also gone on air for the first time, its breakfast show was the continuation of Breakfast Special, presented by Paul Hollingdale.
 1968
January – Tony Blackburn stops presenting the breakfast show on Saturdays. Rather than replace him, BBC Radio 1 simulcasts The Radio 2 Breakfast Show.
 1969
 No events.

1970s 
 1970
 5 January – John Dunn replaces Paul Hollingdale as host of The Radio 2 Breakfast Show.
 6 April – The first Thought for the Day is broadcast on the Today programme, replacing Ten to Eight.
 1971
 No events.
 1972
3 April – Terry Wogan joins BBC Radio 2 to present The Radio 2 Breakfast Show. He replaces John Dunn who moves to afternoons. Breakfast Special disappears from the airwaves after seven years and a new early morning show is introduced, resulting in BBC Radio 2 starting the day on weekdays and Saturdays 30 minutes earlier at 5am. Sunday broadcasting still commenced at just before 7am.
 1973
1 June – Tony Blackburn presents his final Radio 1 Breakfast show, having fronted it since the station went on air in 1967. 
4 June – Noel Edmonds takes over as presenter of Radio 1 Breakfast.
 1974
 No events.
 1975
 No events.
 1976
 No events.
 1977
2 May – BBC Radio 4 launches a new breakfast programme Up to the Hour. Consequently, The Today Programme is reduced from a continuous two-hour programme to two 25-minute slots.
 1978
28 April – Noel Edmonds presents the Radio 1 Breakfast show for the final time.
2 May – Dave Lee Travis takes over as presenter of Radio 1 Breakfast.
3 July – Changes are made to the station's weekday breakfast schedule. After just over a year on air, Up to the Hour is cancelled. Consequently, Today once again becomes a continuous two-hour programme. Also, a new weekday 6am News Briefing is introduced.
 1979
 No events.

1980s 
 1980
 No events.
 1981
2 January – Dave Lee Travis steps down from presenting Radio 1 Breakfast.
5 January – Mike Read succeeds Dave Lee Travis as presenter of Radio 1 Breakfast.
 1982
27 February – Radio 1’s weekend breakfast programme is renamed as Radio 1's Weekend Breakfast Show and Maggie Philbin and Keith Chegwin join Tony Blackburn as co-presenters.
31 December – The last regional opt-out programming ends when the final edition of Morning Sou'West is broadcast ahead of the forthcoming launch of BBC Radio Devon and BBC Radio Cornwall.
 1983
 No events.
 1984
29 September – Radio 1’s weekend breakfast show is revamped with Peter Powell replacing Tony Blackburn as the presenter. The children's requests element of the show is dropped.
 28 December – Terry Wogan ends his first run as presenter of The Radio 2 Breakfast Show as he leaves the station for a while.
 1985
 7 January – Ken Bruce takes over The Radio 2 Breakfast Show
 1986
7 April – Derek Jameson takes over The Radio 2 Breakfast Show from Ken Bruce.
18 April – Mike Read presents his final Radio 1 Breakfast show after five years in the hot seat.
5 May – Mike Smith rejoins Radio 1 for the last time, after spending the past two years working for BBC TV, to take over Radio 1 Breakfast from Mike Read. 
24 December – John Timpson presents The Today programme for the final time.
 1987
3 January – The Today programme is extended to six days a week when it launches a Saturday edition and John Humphrys joins the programme's presenting team as John Timpson's replacement.
 1988
 23 May – Simon Mayo takes over as presenter of Radio 1 Breakfast, replacing Mike Smith. The new programme takes on a zoo format by introducing co-hosts and new features.
1 October – Mark Goodier and Liz Kershaw replace Peter Powell as presenter and co-presenter of Radio 1's Weekend Breakfast Show.
 1989
 1 April – Bruno Brookes replaces Mark Goodier as presenter of Radio 1's Weekend Breakfast Show.

1990s 
 1990
28 August – The first edition of BBC Radio 5's weekday breakfast programme Morning Edition is broadcast. It is presented by Sarah Ward and Jon Briggs.
 1991
 1 May – The launch of 24-hour broadcasting on BBC Radio 1 sees the Simon Mayo Breakfast Show starting and finishing 30 minutes earlier and airing between 6am and 9am.
20 December – Derek Jameson leaves The Radio 2 Breakfast Show after presenting it for five years.
 1992
6 January – Brian Hayes takes over as host of The Radio 2 Breakfast Show. He presents the show for the rest of the year, ending his run on 23 December.
9 February – The final edition of the Bruno and Liz Breakfast show is broadcast on BBC Radio 1.
17 February – Danny Baker replaces Sarah Ward and Jon Briggs as presenter of the BBC Radio 5 weekday breakfast programme Morning Edition.
9 March – Gary Davies takes over as host of Radio 1's Weekend Breakfast Show.
13 July – In a bid to counteract the forthcoming launch of Classic FM, Radio 3 makes major changes to its programmes, including the launch of a new weekday breakfast programme. with On Air replacing Morning Concert on weekdays.
 7 September – Classic FM launches with breakfast show presenter Nick Bailey opening the action at 6am.
 1993
4 January – Terry Wogan returns to the BBC Radio 2 with Wake Up to Wogan.
July – Jonathan Coleman becomes Russ Williams breakfast show co-host on the recently launched Virgin 1215.
3 September – Simon Mayo leaves Radio 1 Breakfast after five years in the chair, ahead of his move to mid-mornings to replace Simon Bates.
6 September – Mark Goodier takes over as presenter of Radio 1 Breakfast and hosts the show until the end of the year.
 November – Michele Stevens replaces Danny Baker as the presenter of Morning Edition on BBC Radio 5.
 1994
1 January – Kevin Greening joins BBC Radio 1 and takes over the Weekend Breakfast from Gary Davies. 
10 January – Steve Wright becomes Radio 1's latest breakfast show presenter.
 27 November – Clive Warren joins BBC Radio 1 and takes over the Weekend Breakfast from Kevin Greening.
 1995
24 April – Chris Evans takes over Radio 1 Breakfast from Steve Wright, following differences with the station's new management.
9 October – Radio 3 begins broadcasting an hour earlier on weekdays at 6am when breakfast show On Air is extended from two to three hours.
21 October – Ahead of a schedule revamp, Johnnie Walker leaves BBC Radio 1. The changes include Clive Warren moving from the weekend breakfast show to the weekday early show, replacing Dave Pearce who launches a new weekend mid-morning show, replacing Kevin Greening who takes over weekend breakfast show which includes a new weekend breakfast series Newsbeat presented by Peter Bowes.
 1996
18 March – Mike Read replaces Nick Bailey as host of Classic FM’s breakfast show.
 1997
January – Chris Evans leaves Radio 1 Breakfast and the station after being dismissed. 
17 February – Mark and Lard become the new presenters of Radio 1 Breakfast.
3 May – Brian Hayes replaces Julian Worricker as BBC Radio 5 Live’s weekend breakfast presenter.
13 October 
 Mark and Lard leave the Radio 1 Breakfast show to move to an afternoon slot and Zoe Ball joins the station to co-host the show with Kevin Greening.
 Chris Evans takes over the Virgin Radio breakfast show from Russ Williams.
 1998
29 March – BBC Radio 3’s Sunday breakfast programme Sacred and Profane is broadcast for the final time.
4 April – The BBC Radio 3 breakfast programme On Air extends to weekends.
6 April – As part of an earlier start to BBC Radio 4’s day, the weekday editions of The Today programme are extended by 30 minutes to three hours.
 7 September – Peter Allen and Jane Garvey take over as presenters of 5 Live Drive which replaces Nationwide as the station's teatime programme. They swap with Julian Worricker who takes over the breakfast programme.
25 September – Kevin Greening leaves Radio 1 Breakfast leaving Zoe Ball as the sole presenter as he moves back to weekends to replace Clive Warren as host of the Sunday weekend breakfast show.
 5 October – Virgin Radio starts simulcasts of the breakfast show on Sky One each morning for an hour between 7:30am and 8:30am. When a track was played on the radio, viewers see the track's video at the same time.
 1999
11 September – Breakfast programme On Air is renamed Morning on 3 on BBC Radio 3.

2000s 
 2000
10 March – Zoe Ball presents Radio 1 Breakfast for the final time as she leaves the station.
 13 March – Scott Mills begins a three-week stint as Radio 1 Breakfast’s temporary presenter.
3 April – Sara Cox takes over as presenter of Radio 1 Breakfast and Mark Chapman joins where he starts hosting his first ever Newsbeat sports bulletins.
 2001
28 June – Chris Evans is dismissed from Virgin Radio for repeatedly failing to arrive at work. He is replaced by the older Steve Penk whom Evans criticised for his age, 39 versus Evans's then 35.
 2002
28 January – Daryl Denham takes over Virgin Radio’s breakfast show from Steve Penk.
 2003
6 January – Pete and Geoff take over as presenters of Virgin Radio’s weekday breakfast show. They replace Daryl Denham who moves to the Drivetime show.
13 January – Nicky Campbell replaces Julian Worricker as co-host of the breakfast show on BBC Radio 5 Live.
9 June – Simon Bates replaces Henry Kelly as Classic FM's weekday breakfast show presenter.
 20 September – Spoony takes over as the sole presenter of Radio 1's Weekend Breakfast Show.
19 December – Sara Cox presents her final Radio 1 Breakfast show.
 2004
5 January – Chris Moyles takes over Radio 1 Breakfast under his own name with a return of the zoo format.
2005
16 December – Pete and Geoff present Virgin Radio’s breakfast show for the final time.
 2006
23 January – Christian O'Connell presents the first edition of The Christian O'Connell Breakfast Show on Virgin Radio.
23 September – Fearne Cotton and Reggie Yates replace Spoony as presenters of Radio 1's Weekend Breakfast Show.
 2007
13 October – Nihal replaces Fearne Cotton and Reggie Yates as the host of Radio 1's Weekend Breakfast Show.
 2008
23 September – Chappers and Dave present Radio 1's Weekend Breakfast Show for six weeks until Nick Grimshaw takes over on 25 October.
 2009
 March – Frank Skinner joins Absolute Radio to host the Saturday breakfast show. The show was initially planned to last 12 weeks but it is extended due to its popularity. The show is still running with both Emily Dean and Alun Cochrane.
26 September – Edith Bowman becomes the permanent presenter of Radio 1's Weekend Breakfast Show after Chappers and Dave and Dev had presented the show over the Summer. 
18 December – After 28 years in 2 separate stints, Sir Terry Wogan presents his final breakfast show.

2010s
2010
11 January – Chris Evans takes over from Sir Terry Wogan as presenter of the breakfast show. The show's launch also sees the return of newsreader Moira Stuart to the BBC after two years away.
2011
 No events.
2012
 7 April – Gemma Cairney replaces Edith Bowman as presenter of Radio 1's Weekend Breakfast Show.
29 June – Tim Lihoreau replaces Mark Forrest as host of the weekday breakfast show on Classic FM with Jane Jones taking over the weekend breakfast show and John Brunning replaces Mark as presenter of the weekly chart show.
14 September – Chris Moyles hosts his final show as he leaves BBC Radio 1 after 15 years of broadcasting. 
24 September – Nick Grimshaw takes over Radio 1 Breakfast.
2013
 April – Tony Livesey becomes the new BBC Radio 5 Live weekend breakfast show host.
16 July – Mishal Husain joins the presenting team of The Today programme on BBC Radio 4. 
15 November – Sara Mohr-Pietsch presents Radio 3 Breakfast for the final time. She is replaced on 2 December by weekend breakfast presenter Clemency Burton-Hill.
2014
 29 March – Dev replaces Gemma Cairney as presenter of Radio 1's Weekend Breakfast Show.
2015
16 December – After 21 years, James Naughtie presents the Today programme for the final time.
2016
 No events.
2017
 No events.
2018
4 February – Good Morning Sunday is relaunched and extended into a three-hour show. Presented by Kate Bottley and Jason Mohammad as Jason himself joins BBC Radio 2.
April – Martha Kearney and Sarah Montague swap roles with Sarah leaving the Today programme after 17 years and Martha leaving The World at One after 11 years.
18 May – Christian O'Connell presents Absolute Radio’s breakfast show for the final time. He is replaced on 4 June by Dave Berry.
9 August – Nick Grimshaw presents Radio 1 Breakfast for the final time.
20 August – Greg James becomes the 16th person to present Radio 1 Breakfast.
26 October – BBC Radio 1 announces a schedule change that will see Matt Edmondson and Mollie King co-presenting the Radio 1 Weekend Breakfast Show.
24 December – After presenting The Radio 2 Breakfast Show for the past eight years, Chris Evans presents the final edition of The Chris Evans Breakfast Show on BBC Radio 2, as he leaves the station to join Virgin Radio UK while Vassos Alexander and Rachel Horne both leave at the same time.
2019
14 January – Zoe Ball takes over as presenter of The Radio 2 Breakfast Show as Richie Anderson, the new travel news reporter for weekday mornings and Tina Daheley both join the station.
6 September – The new early weekend breakfast show on BBC Radio 1 is running from Friday to Sunday and is presented by Arielle Free. Mollie King gained a new slot, namely Best New Pop.
19 September – John Humphrys presents his final edition of Radio 4's Today programme after 32 years.

2020s
 2020
 No events.
 2021
 9 January – Adele Roberts replaces Matt Edmondson and Mollie King as the presenter of Radio 1's Weekend Breakfast Show.
 5 November – Nicky Campbell presents his final Breakfast Show on BBC Radio 5 Live. He had co-presented the show for the past 18 years. 
 8 November – Rick Edwards joins Rachel Burden to present a new-look breakfast show on BBC Radio 5 Live. He replaces Nicky Campbell who moves to a new mid-morning slot.

References

Breakfast radio
Breakfast radio
Breakfast radio